Delfina Skąpska (born 22 November 1950) is a Polish fencer. She competed in the women's individual and team foil events at the 1980 Summer Olympics.

References

External links
 

1950 births
Living people
Polish female fencers
Olympic fencers of Poland
Fencers at the 1980 Summer Olympics
People from Cieszyn County
Sportspeople from Silesian Voivodeship
20th-century Polish women